In mathematics, a superintegrable Hamiltonian system is a Hamiltonian system on a -dimensional  symplectic manifold for which the following conditions hold:

(i) There exist  independent integrals  of motion. Their level surfaces (invariant submanifolds) form a fibered manifold  over a connected open subset .

(ii) There exist smooth real functions  on  such that the Poisson bracket of integrals of motion reads
. 

If , this is the case of a completely integrable Hamiltonian system. The Mishchenko-Fomenko theorem for superintegrable Hamiltonian systems generalizes the Liouville-Arnold theorem on action-angle coordinates of completely integrable Hamiltonian system as follows.

Let invariant submanifolds of a superintegrable Hamiltonian system be connected compact and mutually diffeomorphic. Then the fibered manifold  is a fiber bundle
in tori .
These coordinates are the Darboux coordinates on a symplectic manifold .

The Liouville-Arnold theorem for completely integrable systems and the Mishchenko-Fomenko theorem for the superintegrable ones are generalized to the case of non-compact invariant submanifolds. They are diffeomorphic to a toroidal cylinder .

See also 

Integrable system
Action-angle coordinates
Nambu mechanics
Laplace–Runge–Lenz vector

References 

 Mishchenko, A., Fomenko, A., Generalized Liouville method of integration of Hamiltonian systems, Funct. Anal. Appl. 12 (1978) 113.  
 Bolsinov, A., Jovanovic, B., Noncommutative integrability, moment map and geodesic flows, Ann. Global Anal. Geom. 23 (2003) 305; .
 Fasso, F., Superintegrable Hamiltonian systems: geometry and perturbations, Acta Appl. Math. 87(2005) 93.  
 Fiorani, E., Sardanashvily, G., Global action-angle coordinates for completely integrable systems with non-compact invariant manifolds, J. Math. Phys. 48 (2007) 032901; .
 Miller, W., Jr, Post, S., Winternitz P., Classical and quantum superintegrability with applications, J. Phys. A 46 (2013), no. 42, 423001,    
 Giachetta, G., Mangiarotti, L., Sardanashvily, G., Geometric Methods in Classical and Quantum Mechanics (World Scientific, Singapore, 2010) ; .

Hamiltonian mechanics
Dynamical systems
Integrable systems